Microphone is a 2010 Egyptian independent film by Ahmad Abdalla about the underground art scene of the city of Alexandria, Egypt. The film received Best Arabic-language film Award from Cairo International Film Festival and Tanit d'Or from Journées cinématographiques de Carthage. In addition to Best Editing Award from Dubai International Film Festival in 2010.

Microphone is Ahmad Abdalla's second feature film, following Heliopolis.

Plot 
When Khaled returns to Alexandria after years of travel he discovers that it is too late to rekindle a relationship with his old love because she is about to immigrate and that his relationship with his aging father is broken beyond repair. Self-absorbed, he roams the city and stumbles over the underground art scene: hip-hop singers who perform on sidewalks, female rock musicians on rooftops Massive Scar Era (band), skateboarders cruising all over the city, graffiti artists who confront the city with their shocking murals in the darkness of the night. He is mesmerized by the discovery of this world and his life gradually changes. With his limited resources and connections, he tries to support this movement and draw attention to the diverse facets of his city. Details of his private life and events of this movement overlap. He awaits an inevitable change that he believes will come from the dynamic and unique art scene in Alexandria rather than from Cairo, Egypt's overpopulated capital. 
'Microphone' is a vibrant image of this colorful music and art movement. It is a real narrative of this new generation of artists from Alexandria and the intricate details of their lives. It is the first Egyptian movie to feature the local skateboarding scene

Festival and awards 
Microphone was the first Egyptian film to win the prestigious award The Golden Tanit in Carthage film festival in October 2010.

2011
 Won— Großer Preis der Stadt Freistadt from Festival Der neue Heimatfilm
 Won— Golden Tulip from Istanbul International Film Festival
 Won— Griot Best Film Award of African Film Festival of Tarifa
 Won— Special Mention from Granada International Film Festival Cines del Sur

2010
 Won— Best Arabic-language film Award from Cairo International Film Festival
Won— Best Film from Alexandria International Film Festival
Won— Tanit d'or from Journées cinématographiques de Carthage
Won— Best Editing Award  from Dubai International Film Festival
Nominated— Toronto International Film Festival
Nominated— London International Film Festival
Nominated— Golden Alexander Thessaloniki International Film Festival
Nominated—  Festival International du Film d'Amour de Mons in Brussels, Belgium

Cast 
 Khaled Abol Naga (Khaled)
 Menna Shalabi  (Hadeer)
 Yosra El Lozy (Salma)
 Hany Adel  (Hany)
 Ahmed Magdi   (Magdi)
 Atef Youssef
 Aya Tarek  (Aya)
Yassin Koptan (Yassin)
Mohamed Goda (Nosair)
Cherine Amr (Cherine)

References

External links

Photos of Microphone cast members
 

2010 films
Egyptian independent films
2010 independent films
2010s Arabic-language films